The Tour of Almaty is an annual professional road bicycle racing stage race held in Kazakhstan. It is sanctioned by the International Cycling Union (UCI) as a 2.1 race, as part of the UCI Asia Tour. From 2013 to 2016, the race was held as a one-day race, before moving to its current two-day format in 2017.

History

2014
In 2014 the 2nd annual Tour of Almaty was organized by the Almaty Akimat and the Kazakhstan Cycling Federation. It was broadcast live by Eurosport, KazSport and Almaty channels. More than 20 teams, including Astana Pro Team, competed in the race. The event coincided with the 100 year anniversary of cycling in Kazakhstan. Astana team rider and 2014 Asian Games time trial champion Alexey Lutsenko won the race.

Past winners

References

External links
 

Cycle races in Kazakhstan
UCI Asia Tour races
Recurring sporting events established in 2013
2013 establishments in Kazakhstan